South Shore is the southern coastal area of Blackpool, an English seaside resort in the county of Lancashire. It has a large local community and a number of tourist attractions.

Blackpool Pleasure Beach is in the heart of South Shore. Developed from a gypsy camp, the amusement park's first building was constructed in 1904. The area is also home to South Pier. The Blackpool Tramway runs along the seaward side of the promenade to its terminus at Starr Gate.

There is a variety of tourist attractions, stalls and fast food outlets along South Promenade and also a large shopping area on Lytham Road, where the tramway still runs along part of the road connecting the Rigby Road tram depot to the Promenade at Manchester Square. Pubs in the area include the Royal Oak, Dutton Arms and the Waterloo.

South Shore railway station, in Lytham Road, was the area's first station in 1863. It was renamed Lytham Road station in 1903 and closed in 1916.  also served the area from 1913 to 1949, to be replaced by Blackpool Pleasure Beach railway station, on the same site, in 1987. Waterloo Road railway station opened in 1903, later renamed Blackpool South and still in use today.

The parish church for South Shore is Holy Trinity Church. The present structure was built in 1895, replacing a church of 1836. The oldest houses are believed to be The Old Coach House and Moorbank House, both built around 1850. While these two buildings are now 200 metres from the beach when originally built they enjoyed a view of the sand dunes and the sea which made up the coastline of South Shore until the entire area was developed.

Bloomfield Road, the home of Blackpool F.C., is located in South Shore.

Sandcastle Waterpark is located at South Beach on the site of the former South Shore Open Air Baths.

References
Footnotes

Bibliography

Geography of Blackpool
Seaside resorts in Lancashire